Stenče is a village in the municipality of Brvenica, North Macedonia. It is located close to the Kosovan border.

Historr
According to the 1467-68 Ottoman defter, Žerovjane appears as being largely inhabited by an Orthodox Christian Albanian population. Due to Slavicisation, some families had a mixed Slav-Albanian anthroponomy - usually a Slavic first name and an Albanian last name or last names with Albanian patronyms and Slavic suffixes. 

The names are: Petro Arbanas (t. Arnaut ) ;Gjini son of Dimitri ; Rala , son of Gjon.

Demographics
According to the 2002 census, the village had a total of 150 inhabitants. Ethnic groups in the village include:

Macedonians 149
Serbs 1

References

Villages in Brvenica Municipality